The Business & Entrepreneurship Department is an academic department in the School of Fine & Performing Arts  at Columbia College Chicago.
It offers undergraduate and graduate education in Music Business Management, Live and Performing Arts Management, Media Management, Film Business Management, Sports Management, Visual Arts Management, Arts Management, Design Management, International Arts Management, Marketing, and Advanced Management.

History 
The Business & Entrepreneurship Department  was established in 1976 to help meet the need for proficient arts administrators, managers and entrepreneurs. 
Full and part-time faculties as well as visiting guest lecturers are professional practitioners from the arts, entertainment and media fields. The Business & Entrepreneurship Department is staffed by full-time and part-time faculty who are working within the field that they teach. Business & Entrepreneurship is a member of the Association of Arts Administration Educators.

Programs
The Live & Performing Arts Management Concentration leads to professions in legitimate and musical theater, symphonic and chamber orchestras, other music events, opera and dance companies, and concert productions.

The Media Management Concentration leads to professions in Broadcast Media, Related Electronic Media/Film and Print Media among other specialty areas in the media industry.

The Music Business Management Concentration leads to professions in the recording arts and sciences, music publishing, talent management, new media and entrepreneurship.

The Sports Management Concentration leads to professions in the Sports Industry in the fields of audience building, box office management, special events, facilities management, career and talent development, broadcasting and media management, and merchandising.

The Visual Arts Management Concentration offers opportunities in a broad-ranging field that explores 21st century issues and innovation in traditional museums, commercial galleries, and alternative visual arts settings.

Facilities
In the 618 S. Michigan building are housed the departmental offices, faculty offices, conference room, and smart classrooms. In the 624 S. Michigan building are housed computer facilities and additional smart classrooms with smartboards.

Faculty
 Robert Blandford
 Joe Bogdan
 Jerry Brindisi
 Cara Dehnert Huffman
 Mary Filice
 Alexander Fruchter
 Jessica Jacobs
 Dawn Larsen
 Monique Maye
 Philippe Ravanas
 Beth Ryan
 Justin Sinkovich
 Clayton Smith
 Ryan Smith
 Jason Stephens
 Chamille Weddington
Loren Wells

References

External links
 Business & Entrepreneurship Department, Official Website
 Business & Entrepreneurship Department, AAAE Website

Art schools in Illinois
Columbia College Chicago